Old Masonic Lodge may refer to:

in the United States (by state)
Old Masonic Hall (Benicia, California), listed on the NRHP in Solano County, California
Old Seminary Building, also known as The Old Masonic Lodge, in Lawrenceville, Georgia, NRHP-listed
Old Masonic Hall (Louisville, Mississippi), listed on the NRHP in Mississippi
Old Masonic Hall (Bellville, Texas), NRHP-listed